The Pennsylvania ValleyDawgs were a United States Basketball League team located in Whitehall Township, Pennsylvania in the Lehigh Valley region of eastern Pennsylvania. It operated from 1999 to 2006.

On May 24, 2001, Minnesota Vikings receiver Randy Moss suited up for one game with the ValleyDawgs, scoring seven points in a 113-112 victory over the Long Island Surf.

In 2006, former Survivor contestant Gervase Peterson became a co-owner of the team.  However later that year, after encountering financial difficulties, the team folded and was replaced by the Albany Patroons.

The ValleyDawgs won the USBL championship in 2004. In 2003, the team won the USBL's Eastern Division Finals but lost in the USBL Championship Series.

Home court
The team's home court was William Allen High School gymnasium in center city Allentown, Pennsylvania.  In earlier years, they played at Lehigh University's Stabler Arena.

Head coach
The head coach of the ValleyDawgs was Darryl Dawkins, a former Philadelphia 76ers star who, during his NBA career, was known for his backboard-breaking slam dunks and for amassing the most career fouls in NBA history.

Notes

External links
 HISTORY OF THE UNITED STATES BASKETBALL LEAGUE on apbr.org
Pennsylvania ValleyDawgs Official Web Site
Pennsylvania ValleyDawgs Discussion Forum at LegendHoops.com.

Lehigh County, Pennsylvania
United States Basketball League teams
Defunct basketball teams in Pennsylvania
1999 establishments in Pennsylvania
Basketball teams established in 1999
2006 disestablishments in Pennsylvania
Basketball teams disestablished in 2006